Several U.S. cities and towns hold dogwood festivals. These are usually annual events coinciding with the blooming of dogwood trees in the spring:

The Atlanta Dogwood Festival is an arts-and-crafts fair held annually at Piedmont Park in Atlanta, Georgia.
The Vestavia Hills Dogwood Festival is a multifaceted month-long event in Vestavia Hills, Alabama
The Dogwood Festival of Charlottesville, Virginia has been held since 1958.
The Fayetteville Dogwood Festival in Fayetteville, North Carolina is a three-day event held annually since 1982
Winchester, Tennessee, has held a Dogwood Festival annually since 2005.
The Dogwood Arts Festival is a yearly arts festival in Knoxville, Tennessee, that was started in 1960.
The Dogwood Festival held in Quincy, Illinois annually in May.
The "Dogwood Festival of the Lewis-Clark Valley" is a month-long festival celebrated annually in Lewiston, Idaho
The "Lake of the Ozarks Dogwood Festival" began in 1950 in Camdenton, Missouri.
A Dogwood Festival has been held annually since 1962 in Perry County, Indiana
An annual Dogwood Festival in Farmville, North Carolina was started in 1987
The annual Dogwood Festival in Woodville, Texas was started in 1940.
A Dogwood Festival is held annually in Vinton, Virginia.
A Dogwood Festival takes place in May at Phoenixville, Pennsylvania.
A Dogwood Festival is held annually in April Mebane, North Carolina.
A Dogwood Festival is held annually in May in Mullens, West Virginia.
A Dogwood Festival, dating back to 1936, is held annually in early May in Fairfield, CT.
Dogwood Day is celebrated every May 21 in Milwaukie, Oregon, "The Dogwood City of the West."

References

Dogwood
dogwood
Flower festivals in the United States
Lists of garden festivals